There is a body of ancient and modern fiction set in ancient Greece and ancient Greek culture, including Magna Graecia and Hellenistic kingdoms. Titles include:

Books

Bronze Age and mythistoricals

Atlantis
 Poul Anderson, The Dancer from Atlantis (1971)

Crete

Daedalus
 Michael Ayrton
 The Testament of Daedalus (1962) 
 The Maze Maker (1967)
 Erick Berry, Winged Girl of Knossos (1933) 
 Ernst Schnabel, Story for Icarus (1958)

Theseus, Ariadne, Circe, Phaedra
 Eleanor Farjeon, Ariadne and the Bull (1945) 
 André Gide, Theseus (1946) 
 Roger Lancelyn Green, Mystery at Mycenae (1957) 
 Madeline Miller, Circe (2018)
 Steven Pressfield, Last of the Amazons (2002)
 Mary Renault, "Thesead"
 The King Must Die (1958)
 The Bull from the Sea (1962)
 Tony Robinson & Richard Curtis, Theseus: The King Who Killed the Minotaur (1988) 
 Fred Saberhagen, Ariadne's Web (2000)
 Ian Serraillier, The Way of Danger (1962) 
 Althea Urn, Five Miles from Candia (1959)

Miscellaneous Minoan
 Moyra Caldecott, The Lily and the Bull (1979) 
 Paul Capon, The Kingdom of the Bulls (1961) 
 Kristmann Gudmundsson, Winged Citadel (1940) 
 Nikos Kazantzakis, At the Palaces of Knossos (1981) 
 Dmitri Merezhkovsky, The Birth of the Gods (1924) 
 S.V. Peddle (Vince Peddle & Sandra Peddle), The Moon Maiden (2003) 
 Richard Purtill
 The Golden Gryphon Feather (1979) 
 The Stolen Goddess (1980)
 Thomas Burnett Swann
 The Forest of Forever (1971) 
 Cry Silver Bells (1977) 
 The Day of the Minotaur (1966) 
 James Watson, The Bull Leapers (1970)

Hercules, Jason et al.
 Ivor Bannet, The Amazons (1948) 
 Otar Chiladze, A Man Was Going Down the Road (1973)
 John Gregory Betancourt
 Hercules: The Gates of Hades (2001) 
 Hercules: The Vengeance of Hera (1997) 
 Hercules: The Wrath of Poseidon (1997) 
 Ken Catran, Voyage with Jason (2000) 
 Keith DeCandido
 Cheiron's Warriors (1999) 
 The Ares Alliance (2000) 
 Tobias Druitt, Corydon and the Island of Monsters (2005)
 Robert Graves, The Golden Fleece (U.K.) aka Hercules, My Shipmate (U.S.) (1945)
 Kerry Greenwood, Medea (1997) 
 Edison Marshall, Earth Giant (1960) 
 Fred Saberhagen
 God of the Golden Fleece (2001) 
 The Arms of Hercules (2000) 
 The Face of Apollo (1999) 
 Ian Serraillier, The Clashing Rocks (1963) 
 Miranda Seymour, Medea (1972) 
 Henry Treece, Jason (1961) 
 Christa Wolf, Medea: A Novel (1998) 
 Jane Yolen & Robert J. Harris, Jason and the Gorgon's Blood (2004)

Trojan War
 Pat Barker, The Silence of the Girls (2018)
 Marion Zimmer Bradley, The Firebrand (1987)
 Nancy Bogen, Klytaimnestra, Who Stayed at Home (1980) 
 Lindsay Clarke, The War at Troy (2004) 
 Elizabeth Cook, Achilles (2003)
 Caroline B. Cooney, Goddess of Yesterday (2002) (aka On the Seas to Troy, UK, 2004) 
 Donald Cotton, The Myth Makers, a Doctor Who serial (1965) 
 Gordon Doherty
 The Crimson Throne (2021)
 The Shadow of Troy (2021)
 The Dark Earth (2022)
 Bernard Evslin, The Trojan War (1971) 
 David Gemmell
 Troy: Lord of the Silver Bow  (2005)
 Troy: Shield of Thunder (2006) 
 Adèle Geras, Troy (2000) 
 Noel B. Gerson, The Trojan (1962) 
 Roger Lancelyn Green, The Luck of Troy (1961) 
 Judith Hand, The Amazon and the Warrior (2004) 
 Terence Hawkins, The Rage of Achilles (2009)
 Natalie Haynes, A Thousand Ships (2019)
 Tom Holland, The Poison in the Blood (2006) 
 Jack Lindsay, Cressida's First Lover (1931) 
 Valerio Massimo Manfredi, The Talisman of Troy (2004) 
 Colleen McCullough, The Song of Troy (1998) 
 Maude Meagher, The Green Scamander (1933) 
 Mark Merlis, An Arrow's Flight (1998) 
 Madeline Miller, The Song of Achilles (2011)
 Christopher Morley, The Trojan Horse (1937) 
 Phillip Parotti
 The Greek Generals Talk (1986) 
 The Trojan Generals Talk (1988) 
 Richard Powell, Whom the Gods Would Destroy (1970) 
 Laura Riding, A Trojan Ending (1937) 
 S.P. Somtow, The Shattered Horse (1986) 
 S. M. Stirling
 Against the Tide of Years (1999)
 On the Oceans of Eternity (2000)
 Rex Stout, The Great Legend (1916) 
 Henry Treece, The Windswept City (1967) 
 Barry Unsworth, The Songs of the Kings (2002) 
 Tyrone Walls, To Die Like an Amazon (2002)

Helen
 John Erskine, The Private Life of Helen of Troy (1925) 
 Margaret George, Helen of Troy (2006)
 H. Rider Haggard & Andrew Lang, The World's Desire (1890) 
 Eva Hemmer Hansen, Scandal in Troy (1956) 
 Kevin Mathews, Helen of Troy (1965) 
 Richard Purtill, The Mirror of Helen (1983) 
 Miranda Seymour, Goddess (1979) 
 Edward Lucas White, Helen (1925)

Cassandra
 Hilary Bailey, Cassandra, Princess of Troy (1993) 
 Marion Zimmer Bradley, The Firebrand (1987) 
 Kerry Greenwood, Cassandra (1995)
 Ursule Molinaro, The Autobiography of Cassandra, Princess and Prophetess of Troy (1979) 
 Georgia Sallaska, Priam's Daughter (1970) 
 Christa Wolf, Cassandra (1983)

Odysseus
 John Arden, Cogs Tyrannic (1991) 
 Margaret Atwood, The Penelopiad (2005) 
 Lindsay Clarke, The Return from Troy (2005) 
 H. C. Crew, The Lost King (1929) 
 John Erskine, Penelope's Man: The Homing Instinct (1928) 
 François Fénelon, The Adventures of Telemachus (1699) 
 Adèle Geras, Ithaka (2000)
 Robert Graves, Homer's Daughter (1955) 
 Eyvind Johansson, Return to Ithaca (1952) 
 Eden Phillpotts, Circé's Island (1926) 
 Tony Robinson & Richard Curtis
 Odysseus: The Greatest Hero of Them All (1986) 
 Odysseus: The Journey through Hell (1987) 
 Paul Shipton, The Pig Scrolls (2004) 
 Ernst Schnabel, The Voyage Home (1958) 
 Jane Yolen & Robert J. Harris, Odysseus in the Serpent Maze (2001)

Miscellaneous Mycenaean
 John Barth, Chimera (1972) 
 Roberto Calasso, The Marriage of Cadmus and Harmony (1993) 
 Paul Capon
 Warrior's Moon (1960) 
 Lord of the Chariots (1962) 
 Maurice Druon, The Memoirs of Zeus (1964) 
 John Erskine, Venus: The Lonely Goddess (1949) 
 Jackie French, Oracle (2010)
 Roger Lancelyn Green, The Land Beyond the North (1958) 
 Kerry Greenwood, Electra (1996) 
 Victoria Grossack & Alice Underwood, Iokaste (2004)
 Pierre Louys, The Twilight of The Nymphs (1928) 
 Ursule Molinaro, Power Dreamers: The Jocasta Complex (1995) 
 Phillip Parotti, Fires in the Sky (1990) 
 John Cowper Powys, Atlantis (1954) 
 Steven Pressfield, Last of the Amazons (2002) 
 Mary Ray
 Standing Lions (1968) 
 Shout against the Wind (1970) 
 Song of Thunder (1978) 
 The Golden Bees (1984) 
 Georgia Sallaska
 Three Ships and Three Kings (1969) 
 The Last Heracles (1974) 
 Gladys Schmitt, Electra (1966) 
 Ian Serraillier, The Gorgon's Head (1961) 
 George Shipway
 Warrior in Bronze (1977) 
 King in Splendour (1979) 
 Henry Treece
 The Golden One (1961) 
 Electra (1963) 
 Oedipus (1964)

Based on a television program
 Mel Odom, Young Hercules (1999)

Archaic Greece

Sappho
 Peter Green, The Laughter of Aphrodite (1965) 
 Erica Jong, Sappho's Leap (2003)
 Martha Rofheart, Burning Sappho (1974) 
 Thomas Burnett Swann, Wolfwinter (1972)

Aesop
 John Vornholt, The Fabulist (1993)

Miscellaneous Archaic
 Georg Ebers, An Egyptian Princess (1864) 
 Ernst Eckstein, Aphrodite (1886) 
 Nigel Frith, Olympiad (1988) 
 Tom Holt, Olympiad (2000) 
 David Pownall, The Sphinx and the Sybarites (1993) 
 Mary Ray, The Voice of Apollo (1964) 
 Mary Renault, The Praise Singer (1979) 
 George R. Stewart, Years of the City (1955) 
 Ivan Yefremov, The Land of Foam (1958)

5th century BCE

Persian Wars
 John Buchan, The Moon Endureth (short story "The Lemnian") (1912) 
 John Burke, The Lion of Sparta (1961)
 Christian Cameron, The Long War
 Killer of Men (2010)
 Marathon (2011)
 Poseidon's Spear (2012)
 The Great King (2014)
 Salamis (2015)
 The Rage of Ares (2016)
 William Stearns Davis, A Victor of Salamis: A Tale of the Days of Xerxes, Leonidas, and Themistocles (1907)
 Clare Winger Harris, Persephone of Eleusis (1923)  
 Edward Bulwer-Lytton, Pausanias, the Spartan (1873) 
 Valerio Massimo Manfredi, Spartan (2002) 
 Jon Edward Martin, In Kithairon's Shadow (2003)
 Roderick Milton, Tell Them in Sparta (1962) 
 Margarett Mirley
 The Leave-Takers (2004) 
 Dream-Thoughts (2004) 
 Trysts (2004) 
 Steven Pressfield, Gates of Fire (1998) 
 Mary Renault, The Lion in the Gateway (1964) 
 Caroline Snedeker
 The Perilous Seat (1923) 
 The Spartan (1911) 
 L. Sprague de Camp, The Dragon of the Ishtar Gate (1961)
 Gore Vidal, Creation (1982) 
 Jill Paton Walsh, Farewell, Great King (1972) 
 Gene Wolfe
 Soldier of the Mist  (1986)
 Soldier of Arete (1989)
 Soldier of Sidon (2006)

Pericles and/or Aspasia
 Gertrude Atherton, The Immortal Marriage (1927) 
 Taylor Caldwell, Glory and the Lightning (1974)
 Robert Hamerling, Aspasia (1875) 
 W. Savage Landor, Pericles and Aspasia (1836) 
 Margery Lawrence, The Gate of Yesterday (1960) 
 Rex Warner, Pericles the Athenian (1963)

Alcibiades
 Gertrude Atherton, The Jealous Gods (1928) 
 Charles H. Bromby, Alkibiades (1905) 
 Daniel Chavarría, The Eye of Cybele (2002)
 Anna Bowman Dodd, On the Knees of the Gods (1908) 
 Peter Green, Achilles His Armour (1955) 
 Gertrude R. Levy, The Violet Crown (1954) 
 M. Pardoe, Argle's Oracle (1959) 
 Steven Pressfield, Tides of War (2000) 
 Rosemary Sutcliff, The Flowers of Adonis (1969)

Socrates
 Paul Levinson, The Plot to Save Socrates (2006)
 Cora Mason, Socrates (1953) 
 Fritz Mauthner, Mrs. Socrates (1926) 
 Mary Renault, The Last of the Wine (1956)
 Geoffrey Trease, The Crown of Violet aka Web of Traitors (U.S.) (1952)

Miscellaneous 5th century
 A. J. Church, Callias: A Tale of the Fall of Athens (1892) 
 I. O. Evans, Olympic Runner (1955) 
 Richard Garfinkle, Celestial Matters (1996)
 Tom Holt, Walled Orchard series
 Goatsong: A Novel of Ancient Athens (1989)
 The Walled Orchard (1991)
 John Galen Howard, Pheidias (1929) 
 Noel Langley, Nymph in Clover (1948) 
 Edward Leatham, Charmione: A Tale of the Great Athenian Revolution (1859) 
 Jon Edward Martin, Shades of Artemis (2004) 
 Iona McGregor, The Snake and the Olive (1974) 
 Naomi Mitchison, Cloud Cuckoo Land (1925)
 George Moore, Aphrodite in Aulis (1931) 
 Nicholas Nicastro, The Isle of Stone: A Novel of Ancient Sparta (2005)
 Jan Parandowski, The Olympic Discus (1939) 
 Mary Renault
 The Mask of Apollo (1966)
 The Praise Singer (1978)
 Caroline Snedeker, Theras and His Town (1925) 
 José Carlos Somoza, The Athenian Murders (2002)
 Henry De Vere Stacpoole, The Street of the Flute-Player (1912)
 Arthur S. Way, Sons of the Violet-Crowned (1929) 
 Christoph Martin Wieland, 
 The Story of Agathon (1766-7)
 The Republic of Fools (1774) 
 Frank Yerby, Goat Song (1967)

4th century BCE

Xenophon
 Michael Curtis Ford, The Ten Thousand (2001)
 Xenophon of Ephesus, Ephesian Tale of Anthia and Habrocomes (2nd century)

Alexander the Great
 Anna Apostolou
 A Murder in Macedon (1997) 
 A Murder in Thebes (1998) 
 Konrad Bercovici, Alexander (1928) 
 Ben Bova, Orion and the Conqueror (1994) 
 Mary Butts, The Macedonian (1933)
 Christian Cameron, God of War (2012)
 A. J. Church, A Young Macedonian in the Army of Alexander the Great (1890) 
 Paul C. Doherty
 The House of Death (2001) 
 The Godless Man (2002) 
 The Gates of Hell (2003) 
 Maurice Druon (Maurice Kessel), Alexander the God (1960) 
 David Gemmell
 Lion of Macedon (1990) 
 Dark Prince (1993) 
 Tom Holt, Alexander at the World's End (1999) 
 Nikos Kazantzakis, Alexander the Great (1941) 
 Harold Lamb, Alexander of Macedon (1946) 
 Valerio Massimo Manfredi
 Alexander: Child of a Dream (2001) 
 Alexander: The Sands of Ammon (2001) 
 Alexander: The Ends of the Earth (2001) 
 Klaus Mann, Alexander: a Novel of Utopia 1929) 
 Edison Marshall, The Conqueror (1962) 
 Aubrey Menen, A Conspiracy of Women (1965) 
 Naomi Mitchison, The Young Alexander the Great (1960) 
 Marshall Monroe Kirkman
 Iskander (1903) 
 The Romance of Alexander and Roxana (1909) 
 The Romance of Alexander the King (1909) 
 Nicholas Nicastro, Empire of Ashes (2004) 
 Scott Oden, Memnon (2006)
 Robert Payne, Alexander the God (1954) 
 Steven Pressfield, The Virtues of War (2005)
 Mary Renault, Alexander trilogy
 Fire from Heaven (1969) — the early life of Alexander the Great
 The Persian Boy (1972) — Alexander the Great after his conquest of Persia
 Funeral Games (1981) — the successors of Alexander 
 Katherine Roberts, The Mausoleum Murder (2003) 
 Melissa Scott, A Choice of Destinies (1986) 
 Judith Tarr
 Lord of the Two Lands (1993) 
 Queen of the Amazons (2004)
 Jakob Wasserman, Alexander in Babylon (1949)
 Ivan Yefremov, Thais of Athens (1972)

Miscellaneous 4th century
 Gillian Bradshaw, The Sand-Reckoner (2000) about Archimedes
 Bryher, Gate to the Sea (1958) 
 Margaret Doody, Aristotle and Stephanos series
 Aristotle Detective (1978)
 Aristotle and the Fatal Javelin (1980)
 Aristotle and Poetic Justice (2000)
 Aristotle and the Secrets of Life (2002)
 Anello di bronzo ("Ring of Bronze") (2003)
 Poison in Athens (2004)
 Mysteries of Eleusis (2005)
 John Gardner, The Wreckage of Agathon (1970) 
 Noel Gerson, The Golden Lyre (1963) 
 William Kotzwinkle, Night Book (1974) 
 Valerio Massimo Manfredi, Tyrant (2005)
 Ursule Molinaro, The New Moon with the Old Moon in Her Arms (1990) 
 Mary Renault, Mask of Apollo (1966) 
 Katherine Roberts, The Olympic Conspiracy (2004) 
 Barnaby Ross, The Scrolls of Lysis (1962) 
 José Carlos Somoza, The Athenian Murders (2002) 
 L. Sprague de Camp
 The Arrows of Hercules  (1965)
 An Elephant for Aristotle (1958)
 F. Van Wyck Mason, Lysander (1957) 
 Peter Vansittart, A Choice of Murder (1992)

Hellenistic
 Gillian Bradshaw, The Sand-Reckoner (2000) 
 Chariton of Aphrodisias, Chaereas and Callirhoe (1st century)
 Christian Cameron
 Tyrant (2008)
 Storm of Arrows (2009)
 Funeral Games (2010)
 King of the Bosporus (2011)
 Destroyer of Cities (2013)
 Force of Kings (2014)
 Alfred Duggan, Elephants and Castles (1963) 
 Georg Ebers
 The Sisters (1880) 
 Arachne (1898)
 I. O. Evans, Strange Devices (1950) 
 Vardis Fisher, The Island of the Innocent (1952) 
 William Golding, The Double Tongue (1995) 
 Joan Grant, Return to Elysium (1947) 
 H.D., Hedylus (1928) 
 Jack Lindsay, Come Home at Last (1934) 
 Naomi Mitchison, The Corn King and the Spring Queen (1930) 
 Eden Phillpotts, The Treasures of Typhon (1924) 
 Carolyn Snedeker, The Forgotten Daughter (1933) 
 L. Sprague de Camp
 The Bronze God of Rhodes (1960) 
 The Golden Wind (1969) 
 Duncan Sprott
 The House of the Eagle (2004)
 Daughter of the Crocodile (2006)
 H. N. Turteltaub, "Hellenic Traders" series, set some time after the death of Alexander
 Over the Wine Dark Sea (2001)
 The Gryphon's Skull (2002)
 The Sacred Land (2003)
 Owls to Athens (2004)
 Thornton Wilder, The Woman of Andros (1930)

1st century BCE
 William Golding, The Double Tongue (1995)

2nd century CE
 Achilles Tatius, The Adventures of Leucippe and Clitophon (2nd century)
 Heliodorus of Emesa, Aethiopica or Theagenes and Chariclea (2nd century)
 Longus, Daphnis and Chloe (2nd century)
 Lucian, True History (2nd century AD), not necessarily set anywhere near Greece

Plays
 Andrew David Irvine, Socrates on Trial
 Terence Rattigan, Adventure Story
 William Shakespeare, A Midsummer Night's Dream
 William Shakespeare, Timon of Athens
 William Shakespeare, Troilus and Cressida
 William Shakespeare and John Fletcher, The Two Noble Kinsmen

Comics
 Marvel Illustrated, The Iliad
 Marvel Illustrated, The Odyssey
 Marvel Illustrated, The Trojan War
 Frank Miller, 300
 Eric Shanower, Age of Bronze

See also

 Fiction set in Ancient Rome
 List of historical fiction by time period
 List of films set in ancient Greece

External links 
 Ancient Greece in fiction

 
Historical novels
Lists of novels